Basketball at the 2017 Games of the Small States of Europe was held from 30 May to 3 June 2017.

Medal summary

Men's tournament
Men's tournament was played by six teams, that played a single-legged round robin tournament.

Standings

Results

Women's tournament

Standings
Only four teams participated in the women's competition, consisting in a single-legged round robin tournament.

Results

References

External links
Results at the Official website
Results book

2017 Games of the Small States of Europe
2017
International basketball competitions hosted by San Marino
Small